Kyzyl-Yulduz (Qıźıl Yondoź) is a rural locality (a village) in Chekmagushevsky District, Bashkortostan, Russia. The population was 2 in 2010. There is one street.

Geography 
Kyzyl-Yulduz is located 25 km south of Chekmagush (the district's administrative centre) by road. Kusekeyevo is the nearest rural locality.

References 

Rural localities in Chekmagushevsky District